Te Rigele (born 9 October 1997) is a Chinese tennis player.

On the junior tour, Te has a career-high ranking of No. 48, achieved in January 2015.

Te has a career-high ATP singles ranking of No. 395, achieved on 22 October 2018. On 4 March 2019, he achieved No. 384 in ATP doubles ranking which is his career high. Te has won 3 ITF singles titles and 5 ITF doubles titles. He has yet to reach a final at the ATP Challenger level.

Te made his ATP main draw debut at the 2014 ATP Shenzhen Open, in the doubles draw partnering Qiu Zhuoyang.

ATP Challenger and ITF Futures finals

Singles: 8 (4–4)

Doubles: 10 (6–4)

External links

1997 births
Living people
Chinese male tennis players
People from Hohhot
Tennis players from Inner Mongolia